The Liga Nacional de Fútbol Sala (LNFS) (National Futsal League) is the governing body that runs the major professional futsal leagues in Spain. It was founded in 1989 and serves under the authority of the Royal Spanish Football Federation.

Competitions

Men
 Primera División de Futsal
 Segunda División de Futsal
 Copa de España de Futsal
 Supercopa de España de Futsal

Women
Primera División Femenina de Futsal
Copa Femenina de Futsal

Footballs
Joma currently provide the official ball of the LNFS and is used by all teams.

President
Javier Lozano Cid is the current president of the LNFS.

See also
 Spanish futsal league system
 Royal Spanish Football Federation

External links
 Official website

    
Football governing bodies in Spain
    
Organizations established in 1989